This article is the Electoral history of Lester B. Pearson, the fourteenth Prime Minister of Canada.

A Liberal, he served one term as Prime Minister (1963–1968).  He led the Liberal Party in  four general elections, losing two (1958 and 1962) to John Diefenbaker, and winning two (1963 and 1965), defeating Diefenbaker both times. Both victories resulted in hung parliaments and he formed two minority governments.  He retired in 1968 and was succeeded by Pierre Trudeau.

Pearson stood for election to the House of Commons of Canada eight times, all for the riding of Algoma East in northern Ontario.  He was elected each time.

Summary 

Pearson ranks twelfth out of twenty-three prime ministers for time in office, serving one term of four years and 364 days.

Pearson was the fifth of five prime ministers from Ontario, the others being Sir John A. Macdonald, Alexander Mackenzie, Sir Mackenzie Bowell, and William Lyon Mackenzie King.

Before entering politics, Pearson was a career diplomat in the Department of External Affairs, including being the Canadian Ambassador to the United States.  Prime Minister Mackenzie King invited Pearson several times to join King's government, an invitation Pearson finally accepted in 1948, at the end of King's time in office.  King appointed him Minister of External Affairs and Pearson entered Parliament shortly afterwards by a by-election in the northern Ontario riding of Algoma East.

Pearson served in the government of Louis St. Laurent as Minister of External Affairs from 1948 to 1957.  Following the defeat of the Liberals in the 1957 general election, Pearson succeeded St. Laurent as leader of the Liberal Party of Canada, becoming Leader of the Opposition in 1958.  He was unsuccessful in the first two general elections he contested as leader (1958, 1962), with Diefenbaker continuing in office, but in the general election of 1963 he won a minority government, defeating Diefenbaker.   Pearson was returned to office in the 1965 election, again defeating Diefenbaker, again with a minority government.

Pearson stood for election to the House of Commons eight times and was elected in all eight elections (1948 (by-election), 1949, 1953, 1957, 1958, 1962, 1963 and 1965).  Throughout his parliamentary career, he represented the riding of Algoma East in northern Ontario.  He won each election by a majority of more than 50% of the votes, even in multi-candidate elections.  He served in the Commons for 19 years, 7 months, and 30 days.

In 1968, Pearson announced his retirement and was succeeded as Liberal leader and Prime Minister by Pierre Trudeau.

Federal general elections: 1958 to 1965 

Pearson led the Liberals in four general elections. He was defeated in the general elections of 1958 and 1962, but won minority governments in the elections of 1963 and 1965.

Federal election, 1958 

After winning the Liberal leadership, Pearson challenged the legitimacy of Diefenbaker's minority government.  In response, Diefenbaker called a snap election. He won the largest majority in Canadian history to that time and decimated the Liberals.  In spite of the poor election results, Pearson stayed on as Liberal leader and Leader of the Opposition.

1 Prime Minister when election was called;  Prime Minister after election.
2 Leader of the Opposition when election was called;  Leader of the Opposition after the election.
3 Table does not include parties which received votes but did not elect any members.

Federal election, 1962 

Pearson again led the Liberals in the 1962 election.  Diefenbaker was returned to office, but with a minority government.  The Liberals under Pearson made considerable gains, more than doubling their representation in the Commons.

1  Prime Minister when election was called;  Prime Minister after election.
2  Leader of the Opposition when election was called;  Leader of the Opposition after the election.
3 Table does not include parties which received votes but did not elect any members.

Federal election, 1963 

Less than a year after the 1962 election, Diefenbaker's minority government fell on a motion of non-confidence, triggering the dissolution of Parliament and a general election.  Pearson and the Liberals won the most seats, but fell five seats short of a majority.  Pearson become prime minister of a minority government, and Diefenbaker became Leader of the Opposition.

1 Leader of the Opposition when election was called;  Prime Minister after election.
2 Prime Minister when election was called;  Leader of the Opposition after the election.
3 Table does not include parties which received votes but did not elect any members.

Federal election, 1965 

After two years of minority government, Pearson called an election.  The result was another hung parliament.  The Liberals increased their seat total, but again fell short of an outright majority, this time by two seats.  Pearson governed with a minority government for three years, retiring in 1968.

Federal constituency elections, 1948 to 1965 

Pearson stood for election to the House of Commons eight times, starting with a by-election in 1948.  He was elected all eight times, all from the northern Ontario riding of Algoma East.

1948 Federal By-Election:  Algoma East 

The 1948 by-election was triggered by the appointment of the incumbent Member of Parliament, Thomas Farquhar to the Senate on September 10, 1948.

 Elected.

1949 Federal Election: Algoma East 

 Elected. 
X Incumbent.

1953 Federal Election: Algoma East 

 Elected. 
X Incumbent.

1957 Federal Election: Algoma East 

 Elected. 
X Incumbent.

1958 Federal Election: Algoma East 

 Elected. 
X Incumbent.

1962 Federal Election: Algoma East 

 Elected. 
X Incumbent. 
1 Rounding error.

1963 Federal Election: Algoma East 

 Elected. 
X Incumbent. 
1 Rounding error.

1965 Federal Election: Algoma East 

 Elected. 
X Incumbent.

Liberal Party leadership convention, 1958 

Pearson entered the convention as the favourite, with the support of many of the party establishment.  Paul Martin Sr., the only other serious candidate, hoped to attract the rank and file of the party.  Pearson won on the first ballot.

See also 

 Electoral history of John Diefenbaker - Pearson's predecessor as Prime Minister and principal opponent in three general elections.
 Electoral history of Louis St. Laurent - Pearson's predecessor as leader of the Liberal Party.
 Electoral history of Pierre Trudeau - Pearson's successor as leader of the Liberal Party and as Prime Minister.

References

External links 

 PARLINFO - History of Federal Ridings since 1867
 CPAC – 1958 Liberal Convention

Pearson, Lester B.